Gymnosporangium sabinae (also Gymnosporangium fuscum and other names) (pear rust, European pear rust, or pear trellis rust) is a fungal heteroecious plant pathogen with Juniperus (juniper trees and shrubs) as the primary (telial) host and only Pyrus (pear trees) as secondary (aecial) hosts. It is one of many types of rust fungi affecting plants.

Like many rust diseases, G. sabinae requires two different hosts to complete its life cycle from year to year. Juniper is the winter host and pear is the most common summer host. Spores (called aeciospores) are produced from the fungal lantern-shaped growths which protrude from the blisters on the underside of the pear leaf which become airborne and infect junipers. This fungus overwinters in swellings or galls on infected twigs and branches of susceptible juniper plants. In the spring after a rain or heavy dew, the galls on the juniper produce tiny dark horn-like growths that become covered with an orange-brown gelatinous mass called telia. The corresponding stage on the pear trees is known as aecia. The telia and aecia release wind borne resting or hibernating spores (called teliospores and aeciospores) capable of infecting susceptible pear leaves and Juniper respectively. Spores produced from the fungus-induced swellings on juniper stems can be infectious up to 6 km. The disease causes a yellow-orange spot that turns bright red on leaves of pear trees. The disease can be particularly damaging on pear, resulting in complete defoliation and crop loss if not treated. The fungus feeds on the living cells of the host plant and is not capable of surviving on dead plant material, and so must either alternate with a different host or produce resting spores to pass the dormant season. Pear rust is a regulated disease in some countries.

Control
Pruning out any infected juniper twigs and branches in winter and early spring can help reduce the spread of G. sabinae. The vulnerable point of the fungus lies in its usual inability once established on a tree to reinfect it. Generally, the fungus must cross over to the opposite tree host. The most direct method of control is to exterminate junipers near pear trees. If there is a chance of infection, spraying pear trees with a fungicide in spring and summer (typically a systemic one that is certified as capable of dealing with rust) may help, although this is often not considered worthwhile.

References

Fungi described in 1785
Fungi of Europe
Fungi of Asia
Fungi of Africa
Fungi of North America
Fungal tree pathogens and diseases
Apple tree diseases
Pear tree diseases
Pucciniales
Taxa named by James Dickson (botanist)